Proud Flesh is a 1925 American silent comedy-drama film directed by King Vidor and starring Eleanor Boardman, Pat O'Malley, and Harrison Ford in a romantic triangle.

Plot 
A San Francisco earthquake orphan, Fernanda (Boardman) is adopted and raised as a gentlewoman by relatives in Spain. As a girl she is courted by Don Jaime (Ford), but spurns him and returns to her gauche relatives in California. There she falls in love with a young bathtub manufacturer, Pat (O’Malley).

Cast

Reception
Mordaunt Hall, critic for The New York Times, called the film "a bright entertainment in which there are a slight touch of heart interest and plenty of amusement."

Theme
Vidor made this film, the last of a cycle of four films, in the years just following World War I. The isolationist outlook of many Americans with regard to war-ravaged Europe prompted Vidor to locate the sources of “sexual experimentation and marital triangles” and other social infidelities of the Jazz Age in the Old World. Decadent European manners were contrasted with the fundamentally commonsense virtues that Vidor believed would prevail in the United States.

Footnotes

References
Baxter, John. 1976. King Vidor. Simon & Schuster, Inc. Monarch Film Studies. LOC Card Number .
Durgnat, Raymond and Simmon, Scott. 1988. King Vidor, American. University of California Press, Berkeley.

External links

1925 films
1925 comedy-drama films
American silent feature films
American black-and-white films
Films about orphans
Films based on American novels
Films directed by King Vidor
Films with screenplays by Harry Behn
Metro-Goldwyn-Mayer films
1920s American films
Silent American comedy-drama films
1920s English-language films